Vitaly Zhuravsky (born May 8, 1955) is a Ukrainian MP elected to the Verkhovna Rada in the 2012 Ukrainian parliamentary election for Party of Regions from the Zhytomyr region.

He authored the draft law on defamation in 2012.

References

Living people
People from Zhytomyr Oblast
Party of Regions politicians
Recipients of the Order of Merit (Ukraine), 1st class
Recipients of the Order of Merit (Ukraine), 2nd class
Recipients of the Order of Merit (Ukraine), 3rd class
Third convocation members of the Verkhovna Rada
Sixth convocation members of the Verkhovna Rada
Seventh convocation members of the Verkhovna Rada
University of Kyiv, Journalism Institute alumni
1955 births